Nightmare: The Acoustic MSG is an EP by the McAuley Schenker Group, released only in Japan, as a companion to the album M.S.G.. It contains acoustic versions of songs from M.S.G. and Save Yourself and follows the flow of unplugged recordings which were very trendy in those years. The recording of the unplugged version of these songs and their success in Germany and Japan inspired Schenker and McAuley to tour with only an acoustic set, which was later released in the live album "Unplugged" Live.

Track listing

Track listing Single

Performers
Robin McAuley – vocals
Michael Schenker – guitars

Production
Robin McAuley and Michael Schenker - producers
Recorded at: Studio 56, Hollywood
Mixed by: Doug Michael, Robin McAuley and Michael Schenker

"Never Ending Nightmare" (single edit) 
produced and recorded by: Frank Filipetti
Recorded at: Right Track Studios (NYC)

References

1992 debut EPs
McAuley Schenker Group albums
EMI Records EPs